Mikhaylovka is a town in Volgograd Oblast, Russia, located on the right bank of the Medveditsa River,  northwest of Volgograd. Population:

History
It was established in 1762 as a khutor and named for its owner Mikhail Sebryakov. It was granted town status in 1948. In 1953, Sebryakovsky cement plant was commissioned, and in 1955 - a slate plant. In 1961, the city passed into regional subordination.

June 12, 2012, Mikhaylovka and the district are merged into one municipality - the urban district of the city of Mikhailovka.

Administrative and municipal status
Within the framework of administrative divisions, Mikhaylovka serves as the administrative center of Mikhaylovsky District, even though it is not a part of it. As an administrative division, it is, together with one urban-type settlement, incorporated separately as the town of oblast significance of Mikhaylovka—an administrative unit with the status equal to that of the districts. As a municipal division, territories of the town of oblast significance of Mikhaylovka and of Mikhaylovsky District are incorporated as Mikhaylovka Urban Okrug.

Notable people
 

 Mikhail Murnov (born 1978), former Russian professional football player

References

Notes

Sources

Cities and towns in Volgograd Oblast